The First National Bank is a historic commercial building at 109 East University Street in Siloam Springs, Arkansas.  It is a two-story brick building, trimmed in stone.  Its ground floor is recessed in an arcade supported by square posts, and is separated from the second floor by a stone belt course.  The upper floor windows have round stone arches, with two narrow bays projecting slightly.  The cornice has corbelled brickwork, and is topped in a few places by stone caps.  The building is Siloam Springs' only significant example of Romanesque Revival architecture.

The building was listed on the National Register of Historic Places in 1988.

See also
National Register of Historic Places listings in Benton County, Arkansas

References

Bank buildings on the National Register of Historic Places in Arkansas
Romanesque Revival architecture in Arkansas
Commercial buildings completed in 1890
Buildings and structures in Siloam Springs, Arkansas
1890 establishments in Arkansas
National Register of Historic Places in Benton County, Arkansas
Historic district contributing properties in Arkansas